The Tereshchenko family donated and supported the construction and restoration of Christian churches all over the world.

History
The funds donated by Tereshchenko family helped to build and restore churches like: Cathedral of the Three Anastasias, Pokrovskaya church in Solomenka, Kyiv, St. Nicholas Cathedral in the Pokrovsky monastery, St Volodymyr's Cathedral, Beaulieu-sur-Mer, and Russian Orthodox churches in Cannes.

Cathedral of the Three Anastasias
The first earnings of the family were spent on the restoration of the old wooden Cathedral of the Three Anastasias. The Tereshchenko family took an active part in the building of the cathedral. In 1846, Artemy Tereshchenko started funding the church, whereupon a normal service was resumed. In 1861 and 1872, the altar of the Cross and Resurrection and the altar of the St. Artemy were constructed. Artemy Tereshchenko was the civil trustee of the cathedral, and since 1846 he engaged in maintenance and repair of the church. 
Being devout, Artemy insisted that the most beautiful room of his house was put under the house church. After the final reconstruction of the church, an underground passage was dug that allowed anyone at any time, and in any weather, to get from the house to the crypt of the church, which later equipped the Tereshchenko family's feretory. Artemy and Nikola got up very early in the morning and started the day at 4 a.m. with a prayer in the church.
In 1884, the Chernihiv provincial board approved a resolution on the new project of the Cathedral of the Three Anastasias according to the planning of St. Petersburg Academician of Architecture Andrey Goun. The construction of the new church began a year later, in 1885. Funds for the construction were donated by Artemy Tereshchenko's sons. Thanks to their financial support, the church was built in a relatively quick time, and was consecrated in 1893.
On May 21, 1894 the Tereshchenko brothers appealed to the Holy Synod to allow them to demolish the old Three-Anastasias church, citing the fact that the building was so neglected that it was beyond repair. A special expert committee of professors of the Kyiv Theological Academy gave permission for the demolition and on January 2, 1895 the Holy Synod confirmed it by decree. The Hetman church was demolished during the period of 1895-1897. And on its place they built a chapel, which was destroyed by communists in 1950.
During the World War II the central dome of the temple was destroyed. At the end of the war it was rebuilt in a somewhat modified form. During the restoration and repair of the Cathedral of the Three Anastasias, the crosses which were manufactured from the drawings of Andrey Goun were replaced by Catholic.
The Tereshchenko family charnel house is located at the Cathedral of the Three Anastasias. During the Revolution, the crypt was looted and the slabs of the graves were smashed. After 1991, the graves were re-consecrated and re-ordered.
In 2007, the Cathedral of the Three Anastasias was nominated by Hlukhiv on Ukrainian competition Seven Wonders of Ukraine. As a consequence, the church took the sixth place in the Sumy regional campaign 'Seven Wonders of the Sumy region'.

St. Nicholas Cathedral in the Pokrovsky monastery
St. Nicholas Cathedral - the largest in the size of the temple in Kyiv, built in 1896-1911. Duchess Alexandra Petrovna of Oldenburg, is the founder of the St. Nicholas Cathedral, allocated 3 thousand rubles every month. Due to this fact, in 1900 it was possible to build a cathedral. However, after Her death, and because of the uncertainty of the future sources of funding, the construction was not conducted for nearly two years. The monastery asked for help from benefactors. A substantial contribution, in particular, was made by Tereshchenko family (collectively donated over 50 thousand rubles, including 20 thousand rubles for specially on the gilding domes and silver throne in the future).

St Volodymyr's Cathedral
The priests of the cathedral have always been meeting Elizabeth Tereshchenko with signs of deep respect, and if the Bishop was at the time in the temple, he necessarily went out to greet her. The Tereshchenko family took an active part in the building of this magnificent cathedral. Nikola Tereshchenko presented a plot of land that was located between his mansion and the home of Ivan Nikolovich. He also donated large funds, in particular, for the gilding of all the bells of the temple; the Tereshchenko family invited the most famous artists from all over Russia for the painting of the church, as well as carried out charitable activities and supported the efforts of the ecclesiastics to facilitate the lives of the poor and disadvantaged of the parish.

References

External links
http://www.nikolopokrov.ru/
http://churchs.kiev.ua/index.php?option=com_content&view=article&id=72:2010-09-10-19-53-21&catid=3:2010-09-03-18-31-43&Itemid=12
http://kiev-foto.info/ru/tserkvi/1304-pokrova-presvyatoj-bogoroditsy-na-solomenke
http://churchs.kiev.ua/index.php?option=com_content&view=article&id=96:2010-09-18-07-30-24&catid=4:2010-09-03-18-31-53&Itemid=13
http://trehanastasiy.church.ua/

Eastern Orthodox church buildings
Tereshchenko family